Edgard Alexis Velazquez Clemente (born December 15, 1975) is a former professional baseball outfielder. He is the nephew of Hall of Fame baseball legend Roberto Clemente.

Career
Clemente was drafted by the Colorado Rockies in the 10th round of the 1993 Major League Baseball Draft as "Edgard Velazquez" (sometimes spelled "Velasquez") and was known by that name until just prior to the 1998 season. He was ranked #71 in Baseball America's top 100 prospects for 1997. Clemente made his Major League Baseball debut with the Rockies on September 10, 1998, and most recently played for the Anaheim Angels on July 31, 2000. In 2006, Clemente played for the Somerset Patriots of the Atlantic League of Professional Baseball. In 2010, he played for the Broncos de Reynosa in the Mexican League, batting .364 in 21 games. 

He has two daughters, Nicholle and Valeria.

See also
 List of Major League Baseball players from Puerto Rico

External links

1975 births
Living people
Anaheim Angels players
Arizona League Rockies players
Asheville Tourists players
Broncos de Reynosa players
Colorado Rockies players
Colorado Springs Sky Sox players
Edmonton Trappers players
Puerto Rican expatriate baseball players in Italy
Fortitudo Baseball Bologna players
Indianapolis Indians players
Langosteros de Cancún players
Laredo Broncos players
Leones de Yucatán players
Major League Baseball outfielders
Major League Baseball players from Puerto Rico
Nashua Pride players
New Haven Ravens players
New Jersey Jackals players
Pawtucket Red Sox players
People from Santurce, Puerto Rico
Pericos de Puebla players
Puerto Rican expatriate baseball players in Canada
Puerto Rican expatriate baseball players in Mexico
Salem Avalanche players
Sioux Falls Canaries players
Somerset Patriots players
Sportspeople from San Juan, Puerto Rico
St. Paul Saints players
Trenton Thunder players
Vaqueros Laguna players
York Revolution players